Howard "Howie" Spira is an American gambler and convicted felon who was central to Fay Vincent's decision to ban George Steinbrenner from baseball during the 1990s. In 1991 he was convicted of trying to extort $110,000 from Steinbrenner and spent over two years in prison.

Early life and education
Howard Spira was born in 1959 in the Bronx to poor parents.
Spira attended New York University, studying broadcast journalism, but dropped out in 1980.

FBI informant
During the 1980s, Spira was an informant for the Federal Bureau of Investigation against the Five Families.

Steinbrenner and Winfield
In the late 1980s Spira, working as an unpaid publicist for Dave Winfield's foundation was in debt and contacted Steinbrenner, who was in a conflict with Winfield over payments to Winfield's charitable foundation. Spira offered to provide proof Winfield was misusing charitable funds in exchange for Steinbrenner paying him $150,000, giving him a job, and providing him a room in a hotel owned by Joan Steinbrenner. In January of 1990, Steinbrenner paid him $40,000.

Steinbrenner was suspended from baseball for three years for paying Spira $40,000 to find dirt on Winfield.

Spira was the subject of a 2016 film, The Rise and Fall of Howie Spira.

Personal life
As of 2011, Spira lived with his parents in The Bronx.

References

External links
 

1959 births
Living people
20th-century American criminals
21st-century American criminals
 American gangsters
Federal Bureau of Investigation informants
American extortionists
New York University alumni